United Nations Security Council Resolution 71, adopted on July 27, 1949, asked by the General Assembly on what conditions Liechtenstein might become a party to the Statute of the International Court of Justice. The Council determined that should Liechtenstein accept the provisions of the Statute, accept all the obligations of a member of the United Nations under article 94 of the Charter, undertake to contribute to the expenses of the Court and should the national government ratify the Statute, Liechtenstein would become part to the Statute of the International Court of Justice.

The resolution was adopted with nine votes to none; the Ukrainian SSR and Soviet Union abstained from the vote.

See also
List of United Nations Security Council Resolutions 1 to 100 (1946–1953)

References
Text of the Resolution at undocs.org

External links
 

 0071
 0071
 0071
1949 in Liechtenstein
July 1949 events